San Pedro Ayampuc is a town, with a population of 48,727 (2018 census), and a municipality in the Guatemala department of Guatemala.  the current mayor is Eduardo Avalos Figueroa.

References 

Municipalities of the Guatemala Department